Mosėdis is a small town in Samogitia, northwestern Lithuania in Klaipėda County, mostly known for its Museum of Rare Stones. The museum and impressive outdoor collection were initiated by Vaclovas Intas and have since expanded all over the town.
The town also features a baroque catholic church of 18th century.

Famous citizens 
Svetlana Pauliukaitė, Olympic cyclist

Geography 
The river of Bartuva runs through this town. The closest large city is Klaipėda, it is 58 km south of Mosėdis. It is approximately 34 km away from Baltic Sea, and roughly 12 km away from Latvia.

External links
 Mosėdis gymnasium
 Mosėdis Stone Museum webpage
 Mosedis Shtetl Project

Towns in Lithuania
Towns in Klaipėda County
Telshevsky Uyezd